The 2018–19 season was Kilmarnock's sixth season in the Premiership, and their 26th consecutive season in the top flight of Scottish football.

Overview
Killie, like the previous season, went on a pre-season training camp in La Manga, Spain. On 13 July 2018, manager Steve Clarke said that Youssouf Mulumbu had left Kilmarnock and wasn't expected to return to the club. A Kilmarnock XI took part in two friendly matches. The first was against East Kilbride on 18 July 2018 in which Daniel Higgins scored the only goal of the game to give Killie a 1–0 win. On 22 July 2018, Killie played local junior side Kilwinning Rangers in Ben Lewis's testimonial.

Kilmarnock finished the season in third place - the club's highest league finish since 1966 - and with a record points tally. Eamonn Brophy's 89th-minute penalty secured a 2–1 win over Rangers in the last game of the season to secure third and qualification to the 2019–20 UEFA Europa League.

Kilmarnock were seeded for the group stage draw of the League Cup and were drawn to face Premiership rivals St Mirren along with Dumbarton, Queen's Park and Spartans. In their opening fixture, Kilmarnock drew 0–0 with St Mirren and missed out on the opportunity for a bonus point as they lost 3–2 on penalties. They won their subsequent three matches to finish first in Group H. Killie were eliminated in the second round by Rangers.

Kilmarnock entered the fourth round of the Scottish Cup as one of the Premiership clubs, starting on 19 January 2019. After defeating Forfar Athletic, they lost to Rangers in a fifth round replay.

Results

Pre-season and friendlies

Premiership

Scottish Cup

League Cup

Group stage

Knock-out stage

Club statistics

Competition Overview

League table

Squad statistics

Source:

Player transfers

Transfers in

Transfers out

References

Kilmarnock F.C. seasons
Kilmarnock